Lungotevere di Pietra Papa is the stretch of the lungotevere that connects Lungotevere Vittorio Gassman to Piazza Augusto Righi, in Rome's Portuense district.

The lungotevere is named after the ancient Via Petra Papae, so named because it was located in the property of the family Papa (or Papareschi); it was established by resolution of the city council of 25 November 1949.

In this area, in 1943, were carried out archaeological excavations that unearthed the remains of baths and various Roman rooms probably what remains of the villa belonging to the Horti Caesaris; found mosaics and frescoes are kept in the National Museum in Rome.

Notes

Sources 

Pietra Papa
Rome Q. XI Portuense